Jim Cant is a Scottish former footballer who played for Arbroath, Montrose and Raith Rovers.

References

Scottish footballers
Arbroath F.C. players
Montrose F.C. players
Raith Rovers F.C. players
Year of birth missing (living people)
Living people
Place of birth missing (living people)
Association football forwards